Kim Kyu-tae is a South Korean television director and producer. He directed the Korean dramas A Love to Kill (2005), Iris (2009), Padam Padam (2011), That Winter, the Wind Blows (2013), It's Okay, That's Love (2014) and Moon Lovers: Scarlet Heart Ryeo (2016).

Career
Kim Kyu-tae joined the KBS network in 1996, where he first worked as an assistant director then as a second unit director, notably for Yellow Handkerchief (2003). For the single-episode anthology Drama City, Kim drew critical acclaim in 2004 for two low-budget but visually stylish and experimental episodes: Anagram (starring Kim Yoon-seok and Ku Hye-sun) and Blue Skies of Jeju Island (starring Uhm Tae-woong and Kim Yoon-seok).

A Love to Kill (2005) was Kim's first miniseries as the main director. Written by Lee Kyung-hee, the melodrama starred Rain and Shin Min-a as a K-1 fighter and the actress he targets for revenge but unexpectedly falls for. A Love to Kill was not as well-received ratings-wise as Lee's previous dramas, but Kim won Best New Television Director at the 42nd Baeksang Arts Awards in 2006.

In 2009, he and Yang Yun-ho co-directed Iris, the popular espionage action series starring Lee Byung-hun and Kim Tae-hee. Kim said, "We approached Iris like it was a spy film, so viewers will get to watch movie-like scenes along with the emotional details that have made Korean drama so popular over the years at the same time. [...] We feel great responsibility and excitement at bringing such a genre based on the world's last divided country. While men will be attracted to the action scenes, along with the friendship and revenge between fellow agents and enemies, women can connect with the emotional details between the lovely and handsome characters, torn between love and their duties." Cast member Kim So-yeon said the two different crews were called "Team K" and "Team Y," describing Kim's team as having "a warm charisma and is always filled with quiet laughter. When you shoot in that kind of atmosphere, you feel like you're soaking into that as well."

Kim first worked with screenwriter Noh Hee-kyung when he was the second unit director on The World That They Live In (also known as Worlds Within) in 2008. He reunited with her in 2011 for Padam Padam... The Sound of His and Her Heartbeats, a romance-fantasy about a man who gets released from prison after serving a 16-year sentence for a crime he didn't commit. It was Jung Woo-sung's television comeback and the inaugural drama of newly launched cable network jTBC. Kim said he was "in awe" of Noh's work and wanted to effectively depict her "difficult writing" onscreen.

That Winter, the Wind Blows, a 2013 remake of the Japanese television drama Ai Nante Irane Yo, Natsu ("I Don't Need Love, Summer") in which a con man pretends to be the long-lost brother of a blind heiress, was Kim's third collaboration with Noh and his first time to work for SBS. Kim said, "To help viewers better understand the characters' emotions, I used ultra close-up shots," a visual technique that accentuates even the smallest movement in actors' faces or the twinkle in their eyes. He went on, "The reason we are able to create beautiful shots is because both Jo In-sung and Song Hye-kyo are beautiful people whether we do a full shot or a tight shot. [...] The tone of the drama itself is very heavy that viewers may get frustrated. So I thought the only way to soften up and relax the drama is to capture beautiful scenes. [...] I'm just able to film beautiful things as much as I want." He then used post-production editing to bring out the colors and textures he wanted. Kim was praised for the drama's cinematography, and later won Best Television Director at the 49th Baeksang Arts Awards.

In 2014, Kim directed Secret Love, starring the girl group KARA. It aired on cable channel DRAMAcube and had five different episodes, one for each member of KARA. Scenes from Secret Love were also featured in the music video for the KARA song "Runaway."

Later that year, Kim worked with Noh for the fourth time in It's Okay, That's Love, a romance that explored mental illness, starring Jo In-sung and Gong Hyo-jin as a mystery novelist and a psychiatrist, respectively. Kim called it "a necessary drama," saying he wanted to break away from the traditional genre of a medical drama/romantic comedy by making It's Okay, That's Love into "a hybrid" that puts more weight on breaking the social prejudices toward the minority groups. Kim added, "Ms. Noh, the writer, has the seriousness and the weight and I have the lightness and mass-friendliness. Together we make a great synergy. [...] I personally found it hard to keep the balance between a rom-com and a conventional (melodrama). Every one scene would contain both features. So long as this balance stays unbroken, the drama will be close to perfection."

Kim directed Moon Lovers: Scarlet Heart Ryeo, a Korean remake of the Chinese television series, Scarlet Heart. The 20-episode drama, budgeted at $13 million, premiered on August 29, 2016. The drama is a critical and commercial failure domestically but it drew a more favorable response in other parts of Asia.

Filmography

As assistant director
Colors (KBS2)
Purity (KBS2, 1998)
Paper Crane (KBS2, 1998-1999)
Invitation (KBS2, 1999)
Tough Guy's Love (KBS2, 2000)
Orient Theatre (KBS2, 2001)

As second unit director
Yellow Handkerchief (KBS1, 2003)
Loveholic (KBS2, 2005)
The World That They Live In (KBS2, 2008)

As director
Drama City "After Love" (KBS2, 2004)
Drama City "Our Ham" (KBS2, 2004)
Drama City "Anagram" (KBS2, 2004)
Drama City "Blue Skies of Jeju Island"  (KBS2, 2004)
Drama City "Oh! Sarah" (KBS2, 2005)
A Love to Kill (KBS2, 2005)
Iris (KBS2, 2009)
Padam Padam... The Sound of His and Her Heartbeats (jTBC, 2011-2012)
That Winter, the Wind Blows (SBS, 2013)
Secret Love (DRAMAcube, 2014)
It's Okay, That's Love (SBS, 2014) (also credited as producer)
 Moon Lovers: Scarlet Heart Ryeo (SBS, 2016) (also credited as producer)
 Live (tvN, 2018) (also credited as producer)
 Our Blues (tvN, 2022)

As producer
 Dear My Friends (tvN, 2016)
 The Most Beautiful Goodbye (tvN, 2017)
 The Crowned Clown (tvN, 2019)
 Hotel Del Luna (tvN, 2019)

Awards
2006 42nd Baeksang Arts Awards: Best New Television Director (A Love to Kill)
2010 3rd Korea Drama Awards: Best Production Director for a Miniseries (Iris)
2013 49th Baeksang Arts Awards: Best Television Director (That Winter, the Wind Blows)

References

External links

South Korean television directors
Living people
South Korean television producers
Year of birth missing (living people)